Boniface N'Dong (born September 3, 1977) is a Senegalese retired basketball player and current coach. Currently, he is the head coach of the Senegal national basketball team.  Born in M'Bour, Senegal, he also holds German citizenship.

Professional career
N'Dong had previously planned to enter the NCAA with an American college in hopes to gain major exposure. However, due to his weight being under what American colleges were looking for at the time, those plans were ultimately aborted. Instead, as a 21-year-old, N'Dong had to look into an alternative plan for increasing his talents due to Senegal's professional leagues performing less-than-par of expectations for him. During that time, Dallas Mavericks agent Amadou Fall recommended that he trained in Dirk Nowitzki's former club and improve his skills there. Sometime in early 1999, N'Dong signed with the SpVgg Rattelsdorf in Germany for one-and-a-half seasons of play there. After being undrafted in 1999, he continued training for the next three years in the TSV Tröster Breitengüßbach to further improve his game. In 2003, he would finally improve his skills to play in the Basketball Bundesliga professional league with the TSK uniVersa Bamberg. After playing a season there, he would sign a two-year deal with the Dijon Basket out in the LNB Pro A. During this time, he would gain further exposure from NBA scouts.

The 2005–06 NBA season would be the first and only NBA season for the 28-year-old 7 ft 0 in center to play in the National Basketball Association (NBA) with the Los Angeles Clippers. During this season, N'Dong barely played any notable parts with the team, appearing in 23 games with a 7-minute per game average, starting only once for them. However, the Clippers would ultimately have a surprising season under their belt in his sole season there, making it to the Western Conference semifinals for the first time in franchise history, barely upsetting the Phoenix Suns in the process. In December 2006, he signed with the Russian club Spartak St. Petersburg. N'Dong moved to the Spanish ACB league later that season and signed with Unicaja Málaga for the 2006–07 ACB League play-offs to replace the injured Daniel Santiago. On July 14, 2007, he re-signed with Malaga on a one-season contract. He has also played with the Cleveland Cavaliers NBA Summer League squad in 2007.

In 2009, he signed a two-year contract worth €3.2 million net income with the Spanish league club FC Barcelona. In 2011, he signed a one-year extension contract with Regal Barcelona.

In the summer of 2012, he signed a one-year contract with Galatasaray Medical Park. On June 16, 2013, the day after Galatasaray won the 2012–13 league championship, he announced that he was going to retire.

National team career
N'dong helped the Senegal national team get the silver medal at the FIBA Africa Championship 2005 in Algeria, a competition he won the MVP award.

Coaching career
From 2015 until 2019, N'Dong was an assistant coach for Unicaja Málaga. In the fall of 2020, N'Dong took over as the head coach of the Senegal national basketball team during the qualifiers for AfroBasket 2021.

References

External links
Euroleague.net Profile
NBA.com Bio
Player Profile @ Basketball-Reference.com
Spanish League Profile 
A report in German about N'Dong

1977 births
Living people
Baloncesto Málaga players
Senegalese basketball coaches
BC Spartak Saint Petersburg players
Centers (basketball)
FC Barcelona Bàsquet players
Galatasaray S.K. (men's basketball) players
German men's basketball players
German people of Senegalese descent
People from M'Bour
Liga ACB players
Los Angeles Clippers players
National Basketball Association players from Senegal
Senegalese expatriate basketball people in France
Senegalese expatriate basketball people in Spain
Senegalese expatriate basketball people in the United States
Senegalese expatriate sportspeople in Russia
Undrafted National Basketball Association players